Barbara Parker may refer to:

 Barbara Parker (writer) (1947–2009), American mystery writer
 Barbara Parker (athlete) (born 1982), English track and field athlete
 Barbara Parker (California politician), city attorney of Oakland, California
 Barbara Parker (Arizona politician), Arizona state representative
 Barbara Parker-Mallowan (1908–1993), English archaeologist, Assyriologist, and epigraphist